Anton Graff (18 November 1736 – 22 June 1813) was an eminent Swiss portrait artist.  Among his famous subjects were Friedrich Schiller, Christoph Willibald Gluck, Heinrich von Kleist, Frederick the Great, Friederike Sophie Seyler, Johann Gottfried Herder, Gotthold Ephraim Lessing, Moses Mendelssohn and Christian Felix Weiße. His pupils included Emma Körner, Philipp Otto Runge and Karl Ludwig Kaaz.

Life and work

Anton Graff was born as the seventh child of the craftsman Ulrich Graff and Barbara Graff née Koller at Untertorgasse 8 in Winterthur, Switzerland (the house does not exist anymore). In 1753 Graff started studying painting at the art school of Johann Ulrich Schellenberg in Winterthur. After three years he left Winterthur for Augsburg. There he worked with the etcher Johann Jakob Haid. However, only one year later he was forced to leave Augsburg. He was too successful. The members of the local painters guild feared his competition. With a letter of recommendation from Johann Jakob Haid, he moved to Ansbach where he found employment with the court painter Leonhard Schneider until 1759. Graff travelled frequently to Munich to study the paintings in the different collections. In 1759 he went back to Augsburg and later moved to Regensburg. In 1765 he went back to Winterthur and Zurich. It was there where he received an invitation from Christian Ludwig von Hagedorn, the newly appointed Director of the recently established Dresden Art Academy, to apply for a post at the Dresden Art Academy. Graff hesitated to do so. He thought he was not good enough to work for the princely court of Saxony. To give Hagedorn an impression of his talent he sent a self-portrait to Dresden. The self-portrait arrived on 16 January 1766, in Dresden. It was so well received that only one day later Hagedorn worked out Graff's employment contract. On 7 April 1766, Graff arrived in Dresden where he was appointed court painter and teacher for portrait painting at the Dresden Art Academy, a post he kept for life although he got better paid offers at other academies, among others in Berlin. In early 1788, the Prussian Minister Friedrich Anton von Heynitz made Graff the financially very attractive offer to work for the Prussian Academy of Arts in Berlin. On 7 May 1789, Graff informed Count Camillo Marcolini, general director of the Dresden Art Academy, about this. Marcolini reacted straight away. On 20 June 1789, Graff was appointed Professor for portrait painting at the Dresden Art Academy.

Graff made portraits of nearly 1,000 of his contemporaries and was the leading portrait painter in Germany in the late 18th and early 19th century. Graff was also the main portrait painter of German poets between the Enlightenment and the early Romantic periods. Many of them were also his friends, like Johann Wolfgang von Goethe whom he met in Dresden in 1768. Graff was the favourite portrait painter of the German, Russian, Polish and Baltic nobility. Among others he portrayed Stanislaw Kostka Potocki. His most important clients included Catherine the Great of Russia and Frederick the Great of Prussia. His portrait of Frederick the Great is regarded as his masterpiece. The painting is exhibited at Schloss Charlottenburg. Frederick the Great never posed for Graff. However, Graff received authorization to watch Frederick at a military parade in 1781. This gave Graff the chance to study the physiognomy of the King, and was therefore the basis for his portrait.

Graff was also very popular with the landed gentry, diplomats, musicians and scholars. He portrayed many of them. While painting a portrait, Graff always focused the light on the person's face. In Graff's portraits it was always the face that got the attention and the light, except when the sitter was a lady. In that case he also focused on the lady's décolleté. Graff was a master of light and shadow. His role model in this context was Ján Kupecký whose works he studied in the collections of Ansbach. In comparison with the calmness of the ladies the gentlemen in his portraits often appear serious and reserved.

He also knew how to paint dresses and draperies of different materials and colours in a natural way. His role model in this field was the French court painter Hyacinthe Rigaud. In 1765/66 Graff portrayed Elisabeth Sulzer in a blue silk dress with silver laces and fur collar and borders.

In his early years, Graff did hardly ever paint any background details in his portraits. He usually kept the background monochrome. However, in his later years he also paid more attention to the background. Usually he painted the sitter in outdoor surroundings, as was the fashion at that time in England. The price for a portrait by Graff was calculated by size and details of the sitter's clothes. That it was not always easy for Graff to portrait the famous of the time shows the remark he made while painting Friedrich Schiller: "He cannot sit still." Graff was much in demand. He could live a comfortable life with his income.

In 1769 Graff met Philipp Erasmus Reich, a well known bookseller and publisher in Leipzig. Reich became a good friend of Graff. He engaged him to portrait his scholar friends. In September 1771, Graff travelled to Berlin and portrayed Gotthold Ephraim Lessing in Johann Georg Sulzer's apartment. Lessing's comment on his portrait was: "Do I really look that terribly nice?" In Berlin Graff also portrayed Moses Mendelssohn and Johann Georg Sulzer, his future father-in-law.

In his later years Graff turned to painting landscapes and developed further a sparkling manner of painting that anticipated Impressionism. Philipp Otto Runge and Caspar David Friedrich were influenced by his work.

Graff was a sociable person. He cultivated friendships with many of his sitters, business partners and colleagues such as the Polish engraver Daniel Chodowiecki, the Swiss painters Salomon Gessner and Adrian Zingg and the Saxon engraver Johann Friedrich Bause. Bause reproduced many of Graff's portraits as engravings. This made Graff's name and his artworks also well known within the general public.

Graff travelled quite often to Berlin. His father-in-law, Johann Georg Sulzer, introduced him to members of the Prussian court. He became very popular with the Prussian nobility and they were good customers of him. He never forgot how well he was received within the Prussian society. In 1778 he closed the short autobiography with the sentence: "Berlin habe ich viel zu verdanken" (I owe Berlin much).

On 16 October 1771, Anton Graff married Elisabetha Sophie Augusta Sulzer, called "Guste". Graff and his wife had 5 children. The first daughter, Johanna Catharina Henrietta, died the same year she was born in 1772. Another daughter was born in 1779 and died only a few months later. His second son, Georg, died in 1801. In 1803 Graff underwent cataract surgery. His wife Elisabeth died in 1812. Graff himself died of typhoid fever in the evening of 22 June 1813, at around 8pm in Dresden. He was 76 years old. He left his two surviving children, Caroline Susanne (she married the painter Karl Ludwig Kaaz, a pupil of Graff) and Carl Anton (he became a landscapist), a fortune of 40,000 Thaler. Graff was buried in Dresden. His tomb does not exist anymore.

Graff was a prolific artist. He painted some 2,000 paintings and drawings. His paintings, especially the portraits, are much sought-after. Many of them are in museums and private collections in Switzerland (Museum Oskar Reinhart), Germany (Staatliche Kunstsammlungen Dresden), Russia (Hermitage Museum), Estonia (Kadriorg Palace, Tallinn) and Poland (National Museum, Warsaw). The portraits of gentlemen outnumber the portraits of ladies.

In honour of their famous citizen the Berufsbildungsschule Winterthur (BBW) (School for Vocational Training) named their building after Graff. The "Anton-Graff-Haus".

In Winterthur and Dresden there are streets named after Anton Graff.

2013 jubilee exhibitions take place in the Museum Oskar Reinhart, Winterthur, and in the Old National Gallery in Berlin.

Gallery

References

Notes

Bibliography and catalogue
Berckenhagen, Ekhart: Anton Graff – Leben und Werk. Deutscher Verlag für Kunstwissenschaft, Berlin, 1967 (catalogue raisonné)
 Marc Fehlmann und Birgit Verwiebe (Ed.): Anton Graff: Gesichter einer Epoche. (Exhibition catalogue: Museum Oskar Reinhart, Winterthur; Nationalgalerie – Staatliche Museen zu Berlin.) München: Hirmer, 2013.

Further reading
Johann Caspar Füssli: Joh. Caspar Füesslins Geschichte der besten Künstler in der Schweitz. Nebst ihren Bildnissen. Orell, Gessner, Füessli. Zürich, 1769–1779 (5 Bde)
Otto Waser: Anton Graff 1736–1813. Huber, Frauenfeld u. Leipzig, 1926
Ernest Giddey, Fribourg (Ed.): Préromantisme en Suisse? Editions Universitaires, 1982 (Colloques de la Société Suisse  des Sciences Humaines)
Martin Bircher u. Gisold Lammel, Zürich (Hrsg.): Helvetien in Deutschland. Schweizer Kunst aus Residenzen deutscher Klassik 1770–1830. Zürich, Städtische Galerie zum Strauhof, 1990–91; Schwäbisch Hall, Hällisch-Fränkisches Museum, 1991
Roland Kanz: Dichter und Denker im Porträt. Spurengänge zur deutschen Porträtkultur des 18. Jahrhunderts. Deutscher Kunstverlag, München, 1993
Jane Turner (Editor): The Dictionary of Art (34 volumes). Macmillan (London); Grove (New York), 1996

External links

 

1736 births
1813 deaths
18th-century Swiss painters
18th-century Swiss male artists
Swiss male painters
19th-century Swiss painters
Swiss portrait painters
People from Winterthur
Swiss expatriates in Germany
19th-century German male artists
Academic staff of the Dresden Academy of Fine Arts
19th-century Swiss male artists